Melanie Suessenguth (born 17 May 1984) is a German professional pool player. She is best known for being runner-up in three Euro Tour events: the 2013 Luxembourg Open, the 2015 Braga Open, and the 2019 Veldhoven Open. Suessenguth reached a career-high ranking of third in the Euro Tour in 2021.

References

External links

German pool players

Female pool players
Living people
1984 births
20th-century German women
21st-century German women